Dactylorhiza purpurella, the northern marsh orchid, is an orchid native to Great Britain, Ireland, the Netherlands, Denmark and Norway.

Two varieties are recognised:

Dactylorhiza purpurella var. cambrensis (R.H.Roberts) R.M.Bateman & Denholm - coastal Great Britain and Denmark
Dactylorhiza purpurella subsp. purpurella - Ireland and northern Great Britain. Recorded from Co. Donegal in Ireland.

References

External links
Kew Royal Botanic Gardens, Dactylorhiza purpurella (northern marsh orchid)
Wildscreen Arkive, Dactylorhiza purpurella
Wildflowers of Ireland
Online Atlas of the British and Irish Flora
IOSPE orchid photos, Dactylorhiza cambrensis (R.H.Roberts) Aver. 1984 

purpurella
Orchids of Europe
Flora of Ireland
Flora of Great Britain
Flora of Denmark
Plants described in 1920